Caldbergh with East Scrafton is a civil parish in the Richmondshire district of North Yorkshire, England.  The parish includes the settlements of Caldbergh and East Scrafton.

The population of the parish was estimated at 40 in 2013.

References

Coverdale (dale)
Civil parishes in North Yorkshire